Olegk Motsalin (born April 9, 1986) is a Greek wrestler, who competed for the men's freestyle 74 kg at the 2012 Summer Olympics in London, after winning a silver medal at the World Qualifying Tournament in Helsinki, Finland. He was eliminated in the first round, losing out to Uzbekistan's Soslan Tigiev, who later won the bronze medal in this category, but subsequently disqualified for being tested positive in a banned substance.

Motsalin is also currently a member of Polinikis, being coached and trained by Charalambos Chafousidis.

References

External links 
FILA Profile

1986 births
Living people
Wrestlers at the 2012 Summer Olympics
Olympic wrestlers of Greece
Greek male sport wrestlers
21st-century Greek people